Milczące ślady is a 1960 Polish drama film directed by Zbigniew Kuźmiński.

Cast
 Lech Wojciechowski as Kolacz
 Witold Skaruch as Professor
 Ryszard Kotys as Stusina
 Włodzimierz Skoczylas as Driver Szelongiewicz
 Irena Laskowska as Walczak's wife
 Henryk Bąk as Mjr. Zimny
 Zbigniew Dobrzyński as Ens. Klos
 Kazimierz Fabisiak as Pharmacist Stanislaw Walczak
 Eugeniusz Fulde
 August Kowalczyk as Thunder
 Adam Mularczyk as Waclaw Szyndzielorz
 Witold Pyrkosz as Józef Swider

References

External links
 

1960 films
1960 drama films
Polish drama films
Polish black-and-white films
1960s Polish-language films